In chess, the fool's mate is the checkmate delivered after the fewest possible moves from the game's starting position. It arises from the following moves, or similar:

1. f3 e6
2. g4 Qh4

The fool's mate can be achieved in two moves only by Black, giving checkmate on the second move with the queen. The fool's mate received its name because it can occur only if White commits an extraordinary blunder. The analogous mate delivered by White is done in three moves, where the queen also delivers the mate. Even among rank beginners, this checkmate rarely occurs in practice. 

The mate is an illustration of the  weakness shared by both players along the f- and g-s during the opening phase of the game. Black can be mated in a complementary situation, although this requires an additional move.  A player may also suffer an early checkmate if the f- and g-pawns are advanced prematurely and the kingside is not properly defended, as shown in historical  games recorded in chess literature.

Example

The fool's mate was named and described in The Royal Game of Chess-Play, a 1656 text by Francis Beale that adapted the work of the early chess writer Gioachino Greco.

Prior to the mid-19th century, there was not a prevailing convention as to whether White or Black moved first; according to Beale, the matter was to be decided in some prior contest or decision of the players' choice. In Beale's example, Black was the player to move first, with each player making two moves to various squares or "houses", after which White achieved checkmate.

Beale's example can be paraphrased in modern terms where White always moves first, algebraic notation is used, and Black delivers the fastest possible mate after each player makes two moves: 1.f3 e6 2.g4 Qh4

There are eight distinct ways in which the fool's mate can be reached.  In the sequence there are three moves where one of two options may be chosen, resulting in  possibilities: White may alternate the order of movement of the f- and g-pawns, Black may play either ...e6 or ...e5, and White may move their f-pawn to f3 or f4.

Variations
Mating patterns similar to the fool's mate can occur early in the game. Such patterns in historical games illustrate the weakness alongside the e1–h4 and e8–h5 diagonals early in the game. White can mate Black using a pattern that resembles the fool's mate, though it takes an extra turn.

White to mate in three moves

White can achieve a checkmate similar to the fool's mate.  When the roles are reversed, however, White requires an extra third turn or half-move, known in computer chess as a ply.  In both cases, the principle is the same: a player advances their f- and g-pawns such that the opponent's queen can mate along the unblocked diagonal. A board position illustrating White's version of the fool's mate—with White to mate—was given as a problem in Bobby Fischer Teaches Chess, and also as an early example in a compendium of problems by László Polgár. The solution in Fischer's book bore the comment "Black foolishly weakened his King's defenses. This game took three moves!!"  One possible sequence leading to the position is 1. e4 g5 2. d4 f6 3. Qh5. 

A possibly apocryphal variant of the fool's mate has been reported by several sources.  The 1959 game 1. e4 g5 2. Nc3 f5?? 3. Qh5# has been attributed to Masefield and Trinka, although the first player's name has also been reported as Mayfield or Mansfield and the second player's name as Trinks or Trent. Further, a similar mate can occur in From's Gambit: 1. f4 e5 2. g3 exf4 .

There is another possible three-move mate for White: 1. e4 e5 2. Qh5 Ke7 3. Qxe5.

Teed vs. Delmar

A well-known  in the Dutch Defence occurred in the game Frank Melville Teed–Eugene Delmar, 1896:

1. d4 f5 2. Bg5 h6 3. Bh4 g5 4. Bg3 f4
It seems that Black has won the bishop, but now comes ...

5. e3
Threatening Qh5#.

5... h5 6. Bd3
Probably better is 6.Be2, but the move played sets a trap.

6... Rh6
Defending against Bg6#, but ...

7. Qxh5+
White sacrifices his queen to draw the black rook away from its control of g6.

7... Rxh5 8. Bg6#

Greco vs. NN

A similar trap occurred in a game published by Gioachino Greco in 1625:

1. e4 b6
2. d4 Bb7
3. Bd3 f5?
4. exf5 Bxg2?
5. Qh5+ g6
6. fxg6 Nf6??
Opening up a flight square for the king at f8 with 6...Bg7 would have prolonged the game. White still wins with 7.Qf5! Nf6 8.Bh6 Bxh6 9.gxh7 Bxh1 (9...e6 opens another flight square at e7; then White checks with 10.Qg6+ Ke7) 10.Qg6+ Kf8 11.Qxh6+ Kf7 12.Nh3, but much slower than in the game.
7. gxh7+! Nxh5 
8. Bg6

See also
Checkmate patterns
Damiano Defence
List of chess traps
Scholar's mate

References

Chess checkmates
Chess terminology